Pelochrista huebneriana is a species of moth of the family Tortricidae. It is found in China (Hebei, Shaanxi, Qinghai, Xinjiang), Russia, Kazakhstan and Europe, where it has been recorded from Denmark, Germany, Austria, the Czech Republic, Slovakia, Poland, Sweden, Finland, the Baltic region.

The wingspan is 17–22 mm. Adults have been recorded on wing from June to August.

References

Moths described in 1846
Eucosmini